Łukasz Jasiński (born October 13, 1985) is a Polish footballer who played in the Ekstraklasa for Wisła Płock and Zagłębie Lubin.

Career

Club
He is trainee of Victoria Września. In the summer 2010 he was loaned to Warta Poznań from Zagłębie Lubin.

References

External links
 

1985 births
Living people
Polish footballers
Aluminium Konin players
Obra Kościan players
Wisła Płock players
Tur Turek players
Zagłębie Lubin players
Warta Poznań players
People from Września County
Sportspeople from Greater Poland Voivodeship
Association football defenders